Thorina is a genus of amphipod crustaceans comprising the two species Thorina spinosa and Thorina elongata.

References

External links

Corophiidea
Crustaceans of the Atlantic Ocean